The Kiss is a 1988 supernatural horror film directed by Pen Densham and starring Joanna Pacula and Meredith Salenger. The plot follows two young women who find themselves haunted by an ancient parasitic curse that was passed on to one of them by a kiss. Film critic Harry M. Benshoff has claimed the film to be an allegory of the AIDS epidemic of the late 1980s.

Plot
In 1963 in the Belgian Congo, sisters Hilary and Felice Dunbar are separated in childhood. Felice is sent away on a train with her aunt, who possesses a cursed totem talisman resembling a serpent. En route to Europe, her aunt, compelled by the talisman, attacks Felice, violently kissing her as blood spills from her mouth. The train's conductor finds her aunt's deformed corpse, and Felice departs the train with the talisman.

Twenty five years later in Albany, New York, Hilary lives with her architect husband Jack Halloran and teenage daughter Amy. Their suburban stability is shattered when Hilary receives an unexpected phone call from her estranged sister Felice, now a globe-travelling model. The two arrange to meet, when suddenly Hilary is killed in a gruesome freak car accident.

Five months later, Felice arrives in Albany again, where she has been working as a model for a vitamin company that has relocated from South Africa. Jack invites her to stay with he and Amy. The family's matronly next-door neighbor, Brenda, a nurse, finds Felice off-putting, and suffers allergies similar to those she experiences around cats. One afternoon, Amy and her friend Heather go shopping at the local mall. On the escalator, Heather drops her lipstick, and goes down to retrieve it, upon which her necklace is caught in the grate. Amy attempts to free her but fails, and Heather is badly mangled by the escalator, but survives.

In Felice's belongings, Amy uncovers the talisman, along with several artifacts, including Heather's bloodied sunglasses. Amy is suspicious of her, and tension begins to mount between them as Felice makes romantic advances on her father. One night, Jack goes downstairs after hearing a noise, and is attacked by a wild cat who escapes through the kitchen window; Amy is able to find some solace in her love interest, Terry. When Amy confides in him of Felice's mysterious behavior, Terry goes to confront her at her hotel, and stumbles in on her in the midst of a bizarre ritual, after which he is struck by a vehicle and killed, made to appear a suicide.

Amy goes to her local priest to confide in her fears; the priest tells her that her mother had told him of her relationship with Felice in their childhood, and that she believed Felice was schizophrenic. Felice interrupts the meeting; the priest flees and attempts to meet Jack at his office, but is killed by spontaneous combustion by Felice's powers in an elevator. Jack leaves to go on a business trip, but is contacted by Brenda before he boards the plane, telling him she had a sample of Felice's blood analyzed by a lab, and that her blood resembles that of a corpse.

Jack deboards the plane and quickly returns home. Upstairs he finds Amy pale and on the verge of death. Felice confronts Jack, explaining that Amy is her bloodline, and that in order for her to survive, she must pass on the curse to Amy and live through her blood. Felice seduces him, while Amy escapes from the house with Brenda. While attempting to escape the backyard, they are attacked by a wild cat, which is revealed to be a therianthropic manifestation of Felice. Brenda kills the cat, and Felice attacks Amy, attempting to kiss her and pass on the parasite.

Jack  attacks Felice and the two fall into the swimming pool. Amy impales her with electric gardening shears, and the three struggle in the pool as Felice's body begins to wither away. The parasite, the physical manifestation of the curse, swims through the pool, swimming to Amy to try and possess her, but is killed in an explosion caused by a propane tank. The three embrace, as Felice's body sinks to the bottom of the pool.

Cast

Production

Development
The screenplay for The Kiss was written by Stephen Volk, who had previously written Gothic (1986) for Ken Russell, and would follow The Kiss with William Friedkin's The Guardian (1990). Though set in Albany, New York, the film was shot on location in Montreal, Québec, Canada. Describing the film, director Pen Densham described it as "somewhere between The Exorcist and Poltergeist." The film had the working title The Host.

Filming
Principal photography began in Montreal on August 25, 1987. The church sequences were filmed at St. Martin's Church in Westmount. Its special effects team was made up of Charles Carter, and Chris Walas, who supplied the special effects on Gremlins (1984) and David Cronenberg's The Fly (1986).

Release

Box office
The Kiss was released theatrically in the United States on October 14, 1988 through TriStar Pictures. The film grossed $1.9 million in the United States, and reportedly sold around 25,000 tickets in Québec, where it was filmed.

Critical response
The film received mixed reviews from critics, and as of 2022 holds a 42% audience rating on internet review aggregator Rotten Tomatoes.

Janet Maslin of The New York Times called the film "rich in disgusting special effects and poor in every other regard," and remarked its unimpressive performances. Time Out called the film a "daft and derivative possession pic," noting Mimi Kuzyk as providing "the only shred of credible humanity." LA Weekly described the film as a "still, regurgitated mess of genre stew." Variety criticized the film for lacking development in its supernatural plot, adding, "if the setups were hokier, they might have been funny." Roger Hurlburt of the Sun-Sentinel noted: "The Kiss has a few moments, but too much talk and slow, oh-so-slow sequences leading up to the action, pad the film terribly. There was potential here—not for a great horror film, understand—but a nifty little potboiler," though he conceded the film features "above-average direction."

Leonard Maltin gave the film a mildly positive review, calling it an "occasionally scary horror film that builds up to but downplays the sexual implications of its Cat People–style story of a family curse passed down to each generation by a woman-to-woman kiss." The Los Angeles Timess Kevin Thomas also compared the film to Cat People, praising it as "smart, fast, and sassy, as much fun as it is scary in its shock-cut grisliness...  the film makers are adept in playing the most bizarre and grisly happenings against an atmosphere of the utmost normality." Michael Price of the Fort Worth Star-Telegram deemed the film "an eerie, often inept but strangely rewarding oddity...  director Pen Densham succeeds brilliantly at rendering his audience vulnerable." Peter Travers, writing for People, summarized: "Densham renders each mishap with graphic glee. Mimi Kuzyk, from TV’s Hill Street Blues, provides welcome comic relief as a neighbor who teaches Salenger about glow-in-the-dark condoms, Marlene Dietrich movies and how to electrocute a demon cat. But the grotesque soon drowns out the giggles, making The Kiss easy to kiss off."

Home media
The film was released on VHS, and later on DVD in February 2004 by Columbia TriStar Home Video.

References

Sources

External links

1988 films
1988 horror films
TriStar Pictures films
Films set in Albany, New York
Films set in Africa
American supernatural horror films
Canadian supernatural horror films
English-language Canadian films
Films about curses
Films set in 1963
Films set in 1988
Films about Voodoo
Films shot in Montreal
Films scored by J. Peter Robinson
Films directed by Pen Densham
1980s English-language films
1980s American films
1980s Canadian films